Quiz Call was a late night/early morning phone-in quiz TV show, produced by Ostrich Media (owned by iTouch) for Five, Five US and Five Life.

History

Launch 
Quiz Call was launched as a standalone participation television channel in August 2005 on the Freeview and NTL platforms, and launched on the Sky Digital platform shortly afterwards.

The show encourages viewers to enter by calling a premium-rate telephone number or for free via their website.
On 22 April 2006, the channel made its début on analogue terrestrial television when it aired overnight on Five.

In June 2006, Quiz Call had a slight revamp. They replaced half of the original set with a purple and gold themed set. This set was used mainly as their set for use when broadcasting on Five. The graphics also changed at this time.

On 6 August 2006, Quiz Call gave viewers a unique opportunity to win a brand-new car. Callers who got through to the studio had their name put into a bowl and at the end of the broadcast the person who was selected was called back live on air to answer a question. The car was won by Tracy from Newquay.

On 1 September 2006, Quiz Call celebrated its first birthday with a 41 Hour Marathon Live Broadcast giving viewers the chance to play for a jackpot of £100,000 by guessing a 4-digit combination.

Sale
On 19 October 2006, Channel 4 announced they would be selling Ostrich Media and announced the sale of Ostrich Media to iTouch Media on 3 November 2006. The sale included the Quiz Call channel, its slots on NTL and digital satellite, as well as the company's back room technology including its customer relations management capability.

The deal did not however, include the slot on Freeview, and since 15 November 2006, Channel 4 used the space to broadcast Film4+1, and subsequently Channel 4+1.

The loss of the slot on Freeview had reduced the broadcasting hours from 12:00 – 03:00 to 19:00 – 01:00. During this time, the channel maintained a position on Freeview as it was shown on Ftn, between 22:00 and 01:00. This agreement ended on 1 January 2007.

Sky EPG slot closure
Quiz Call withdrew from the Sky EPG on 1 January 2007. Viewers were at first greeted by a caption stating Quiz Call will be back in mid-January this was then replaced by a test card with the Quiz Call logo and information stating that The service has now ceased. The channel was removed from the EPG soon afterwards.

Return as Five show

Subsequently, in 2007, Ostrich Media was commissioned by Five to produce a run of Quiz Call to broadcast as a programme within the late night/early morning slot on the channel and sister channel Five USA. This arrangement saw Five – which had trialled a run of Quiz Call before switching to The Great Big British Quiz in 2006 – drop TGBBQ and revert to using Quiz Call as their late night quiz provider.

On a number of occasions in 2008, Quiz Call has switched from Five to Five US because of live sport being shown on Five. The cash amounts decreased enormously from sometimes the highest cash amount being £2,000 and then dropped to £500.

Removal of the show

On Thursday 10 September, presenter Liz Fuller announced that Quiz Call would end on Five on Saturday 12 September 2009 after 3 years on Channel 5.

The decision to end Quiz Call came after Five signed a deal with NetPlay TV to broadcast Live Roulette on Five three nights a week; these broadcasts, which were made possible due to the relaxation of the rules regarding such broadcasts on UK terrestrial TV, replaced Quiz Call in the schedule.

The official Quiz Call website states that the show intends to return at an unspecified point in the future. The show may return as a standard Freeview channel. The Quiz Call website has been taken off the Internet but there is still the possibility of the show returning in the Future.

Show format
A grid or table of money amounts is shown on screen. Behind each amount lies an answer to the main question. The main question is normally given in a clue word with associated answer. For example, Films 'M', Black or Things That Are Red. A possible 10 – 18 answers are available with numerous outcomes but only the answers on the grid/table are correct. The host will take calls at random for callers to answer the question, and if it corresponds to an answer on the grid/table they will win a cash prize shown that is available. Around halfway through the show, when the presenters swap, the cash considerably drops. for example, the top answer that was worth £3000 drops down to around £500-£750, and the smallest answer of around £100-£250, drops to around £25-£50.

Various situations will happen during the show as to how much is available, such as double, triple, 4×, 5×, 6×, 7×, 8×, 9× and even 10× the money, extra answers, instant wins or jackpot amounts.

Since the show's relaunch on Five, it was revealed on 8 August 2009 that they had given away over £8 million in prizes and £650,000 had been given away in 2009, and on 27 August 2009, it was revealed £710,000 had been given away to 1930 winners so far in 2009.

Controversy
On 24 September 2006, Quiz Call admitted to The Sunday Times that they had manipulated games by blocking callers from taking part for periods of up to 40 minutes. Under headlines of "naked profiteering", Quiz Call said that on these occasions, it charged thousands of callers a standard 75p premium line fee – knowing that it would give them no chance to answer the prize question. At the culture, media and sport committee, held on 28 November 2006, representatives from Quiz Call admitted that one instance of people being put on hold did occur and that the producer responsible no longer works for Ostrich Media.

Quiz Call, which once offered a £100,000 jackpot, admitted that the show's producer was responsible for deciding how long callers had to wait to enter the games. It admitted that Quiz Call had been caught out cutting corners, in using its own staff to pose as prize winners, clutching 3-foot cheques in an on-air promotion, though there was no suggestion that any employees had been playing or winning the games.

The BBC Radio 4 programme You and Yours broadcast a segment on Quiz Call on 10 October 2006, who were contacted by listeners who had been barred by the channel. One listener, Mari Hamilton from Aylesbury who used the on-air name 'Luna', contacted the programme to say that they were blocked by the channel after winning a number of cash prizes using the free web entry option.

Quiz Call was removed from TV screens as part of Five's review into all its premium rate phone calling quiz programmes in March 2007, and returned on the evening of 30 March 2007.

At least one independent individual has estimated Ostrich Media to be drawing more than £23,000 per hour of the show being on air, or around £100,000 per evening based on the new legal requirement to show the number of calls received in any particular minute.

Quiz Call presenters
Presenters who have hosted the show include:
Chris Hopkins
Chris Park
Alex Kramer
Liz Fuller 
Debbie King
Kay Little
Vicky Letch
James Callow
Derek Gibbons
Zö Christien
Kait Borsay
Keith Price
Russ Spencer
Pollyanna Woodward
Nikki Cowan
Suzanne Cowie
Alan Ennis
Ruth Frances
Lawrie Jordan
Paul Hendy
Dan Warren
Steve Hyland
Carol Machin
Sean Macintosh
Charlie McArdle
Abi Pethullis
Cat Porter
Craig Rowe
Mike Mason
Lottie Mayor
Carmel Thomas
Kirsty Duffy
Gemma Scott
Liz Summers
Mark Rumble
Anna Fowler

For the last week of the show, 4 of the 7 presenters who were working for Quiz Call at the time presented. The 3 that did not present were Russ Spencer, Pollyanna Woodward and Keith Price. The presenter for the last 3 shows were as follows. Thursday – Liz Fuller and Kait Borsay, Friday – Chris Hopkins and Chris Park, and on the final show, Saturday – Liz Fuller and Chris Park.

References

External links
Quiz Call
Clip showing examples of Quiz Call solutions (YouTube)

Channel 5 (British TV channel) original programming
2005 British television series debuts
2009 British television series endings
Phone-in quiz shows
Television channels and stations established in 2005
Television channels and stations disestablished in 2007
Defunct television channels in the United Kingdom
Television shows shot at Teddington Studios